Folasade Tolulope Ogunsola (born 1958) is a Nigerian professor of medical microbiology, and the Vice-Chancellor of the University of Lagos. She specializes in disease control, particularly HIV/AIDS. Ogunsola was provost of College of Medicine, University of Lagos and is reputed as being the first woman to occupy the position. She was also the Deputy Vice Chancellor (Development Services) of the institution between 2017 and 2021. She was acting vice chancellor of the University of Lagos for a short period in 2020 when the University was plunged into crisis as a result of the removal of the Vice Chancellor by the University Council.

Early life and education 
Ogunsola was raised in University of Ibadan where her father, Akin Mabogunje lectured. As a child, she mimicked medical practitioners by using dolls as patients, while offering medical care to them. She attended Queen's College, Lagos. Between 1974 and 1982, she obtained her first degree from University of Ife. and a master's degree from College of Medicine, University of Lagos, then proceeded for her doctorate at University of Wales between 1992 and 1997.

Career 
Ogunsola was Acting Vice Chancellor of the University of Lagos for a short period in 2020 when the University was plunged into crisis as a result of the removal of the Vice Chancellor by the University Council. She was also the Deputy Vice-Chancellor (Development Services) of the University, a position she previously occupied before ascending to the institution's Acting Vice Chancellorship. Before being the deputy vice-chancellor, she was the provost of the College of Medicine, University of Lagos. Her research areas have been centred on the regulation and management of viral diseases, particularly HIV. She is the principal investigator at the AIDS Prevention Initiative in Nigeria (APIN) at the University of Lagos. She has also been the chairman of the Infection Control Committee of Lagos University Teaching Hospital. Additionally, she is the chairman of the National Association of Colleges of Medicine in Nigeria.

In 2018, she expressed concern on disease prevention and control in Nigeria. She identified poor hygiene and overuse of antibiotics as practices that foster antimicrobial-drug resistance. Providing a solution, she maintained that "sustained Infection Prevention and Control (IPC) infrastructure and programs should be built around a set of core components which includes guidelines, training, surveillance, multimodal strategies for implementing IPC, monitoring and evaluation among others". Speaking during a session with the media, she explained that the solution to reducing the 58% unemployment rate was for Nigerian graduates to begin innovating ideas that will enhance human life. She also noted that knowledge in itself isn't sufficient, but its application in an appropriate manner to better mankind and enhance livelihood of others is what youths should be concerned about.

She was a founding member of the Nigerian Society for Infection control in 1998 and is also a member of the Global Infection Prevention and control Network.

She was elected as the acting vice chancellor of University of Lagos on 24 August 2020, by the university's senate following a crisis between the pro-chancellor, Mr. Wale Babalakin and the vice-chancellor, Prof. Oluwatoyin Ogundipe. She became the first woman to be vice-chancellor in the university's history.

Publications 

 Modification of a PCR Ribotyping Method for Application as a Routine Typing Scheme for Clostridium difficile, 1996
Infections caused by Acinetobacter species and their susceptibility to 14 antibiotics in Lagos University Teaching Hospital, Lagos, 2002
 Attitudes of Health Care Providers to Persons Living with HIV/AIDS in Lagos State, Nigeria, 2003
 Extended-Spectrum β-Lactamase Enzymes in Clinical Isolates of Enterobacter Species from Lagos, Nigeria, 2003
 Risk factors for ectopic pregnancy in Lagos, Nigeria, 2005
 Challenges for the sexual health and social acceptance of men who have sex with men in Nigeria, 2007
Associated risk factors and pulsed field gel electrophoresis of nasal isolates of Staphylococcus aureus from medical students in a tertiary hospital in Lagos, Nigeria, 2007
 Effectiveness of cellulose sulfate vaginal gel for the prevention of HIV infection: results of a Phase III trial in Nigeria, 2008
 The effects of antimicrobial therapy on bacterial vaginosis in non‐pregnant women, 2009
 Antimicrobial susceptibility and serovars of Salmonella from chickens and humans in Ibadan, Nigeria, 2010
Characterization of methicillin-susceptible and -resistant staphylococci in the clinical setting: a multi-centre study in Nigeria, 2012
A community-engaged infection prevention and control approach to Ebola, 2015

External links 
 https://scholar.google.com/citations?user=HemfnRwAAAAJ&hl=en

References 

University of Lagos alumni
Academic staff of the University of Lagos
Nigerian women academics
Nigerian microbiologists
Alumni of the University of Wales
1958 births
Obafemi Awolowo University alumni
HIV/AIDS researchers
Living people
Yoruba women academics
Yoruba women scientists
Nigerian medical researchers
Nigerian women scientists
Nigerian women biologists
Queen's College, Lagos alumni
Vice-Chancellors of the University of Lagos
Women heads of universities and colleges